Mohammad Saleem (Urdu محمد سلیم) better known as Saleem Javed is a Pakistani pop singer born in Hyderabad, Pakistan. He emerged to fame in the 1980s, though, he was already known in some quarters before that, as a semi-classical singer due to his work in the classical industry. Saleem Javed practically started the trend of Re-Mixing old songs with new instrumentation and improvisation in early 80s. He did the first ever re-mix in his first album Listen to My Voice launched in 1985 in Pakistan and the song was " Janam Aii Janam by Legendary Madom Noor Jehan "

Discography

Albums
<div style="font-size: 95%">

References

Pakistani pop singers
Living people
People from Hyderabad District, Pakistan
Pakistani choreographers
1952 births